Felix is an unincorporated community in Calaveras County, California, in Salt Spring Valley  west-southwest of Angels Camp. It lies at an elevation of 1115 feet (340 m). A post office operated here from 1896 to 1923.

References

External links

Unincorporated communities in California
Unincorporated communities in Calaveras County, California